Monster Rancher is an anime series based on the video game series made by Tecmo. The episodes are directed by Hiroyuki Yano, who also directed Daigunder and co-directed a Lupin III television special. The Japanese animation studio TMS Entertainment produced the show. 

In Japan, under the title Monster Farm, the series was broadcast on TBS for two seasons; the first 48-episode season, aired from April 17, 1999, to March 25, 2000; the second 25-episode season, aired from April 1 to September 30, 2000. The series was brought to the United States by BKN, with an English dub produced by Ocean Studios. It was broadcast in the United States on the BKN Kids Network, the Sci-Fi Channel, the Fox Family Channel, and Fox Kids. and in Canada on YTV. 

ADV Films licensed the home video rights to the series and released its first twelve episodes on four DVDs. In 2005, BKN International A.G. licensed the DVD rights for 73 episodes of Monster Rancher to Digiview Productions; however, only one DVD was released. In 2012, the series was available for streaming on Hulu. Discotek Media licensed the series in 2013, and released it on three English-dubbed DVD box sets in 2014, and a single box set with the original Japanese audio subtitled and uncut on July 28, 2015. Discotek Media later released the series on a Blu-ray Disc set on May 29, 2018.

Series overview

Season 1: The Secret of the Stone Disk

Season 2: The Legendary Path

References

External links
List of episodes at tv.com
Monster Rancher - Official Order at TheTVDB

Monster Rancher
Monster Rancher